Springhill High School may refer to these schools:

 Springhill High School (Nova Scotia), in Canada
 Springhill High School (Rochdale), in England
 Springhill High School (Louisiana), in the United States

See also
 Spring Hill High School (disambiguation)